Below are team rosters for Softball at the 2008 Summer Olympics.

Australia
Jodie Bowering
Kylie Cronk
Kelly Hardie
Tanya Harding
Sandy Lewis
Simmone Morrow
Tracey Mosley
Stacey Porter
Melanie Roche
Justine Smethurst
Danielle Stewart
Natalie Titcume
Natalie Ward
Belinda Wright
Kerry Wyborn

Canada
Lauren Bay Regula
Alison Bradley
Erin Cumpstone
Sheena Lawrick
Danielle Lawrie
Caitlin Lever
Robin Mackin
Noémie Marin
Melanie Matthews
Erin McLean
Dione Meier
Kaleigh Rafter
Jennifer Salling
Megan Timpf
Jennifer Yee

China
Guo Jia
Lei Donghui
Li Chunxia
Li Qi
Lü Wei
Pan Xia
Sun Li
Tan Ying
Wu Di
Xin Minhong
Yu Huili
Yu Yanhong
Zhang Ai
Zhang Lifang
Zhou Yi

Chinese Taipei
Chen Miao Yi
Chiang Hui Chuan
Chueh Ming Hui
Hsu Hsiu Ling
Huang Hui Wen
Lai Meng Ting
Lai Sheng Jung
Li Chiu Ching
Lin Su Hua
Lo Hsiao Ting
Lu Hsueh Mei
Pan-Tzu Hui
Tung Yun Chi
Wen Li Hsiu
Wu Chia Yen

Japan
Naho Emoto
Motoko Fujimoto
Megu Hirose
Emi Inui
Sachiko Ito
Ayumi Karino
Satoko Mabuchi
Yukiyo Mine
Masumi Mishina
Rei Nishiyama
Hiroko Sakai
Rie Sato
Mika Someya
Yukiko Ueno
Eri Yamada

Netherlands
Noémi Boekel
Marloes Fellinger
Sandra Gouverneur
Petra van Heijst
Judith van Kampen
Kim Kluijskens
Saskia Kosterink
Jolanda Kroesen
Daisy de Peinder
Marjan Smit
Rebecca Soumeru
Nathalie Timmermans
Ellen Venker
Britt Vonk
Kristi de Vries

United States
Monica Abbott
Laura Berg
Crystl Bustos
Andrea Duran
Jennie Finch
Tairia Flowers
Victoria Galindo
Lovieanne Jung
Kelly Kretschman
Lauren Lappin
Caitlin Lowe
Jessica Mendoza
Stacey Nuveman
Cat Osterman
Natasha Watley

Venezuela
Yuruby Alicart
Mariangee Bogado
Marianella Castellanos
Zuleima Cirimelle
Denisse Fuenmayor
Johana Gómez
Desiree Mújica
Yusmary Pérez
Jineth Pimentel
Geraldine Puertas
Maribel Riera
Mailes Rodríguez
Rubilena Rojas
Yaicey Sojo
María Soto

References

 
2008